Triple M Gold Coast (ACMA callsign: 4GLD) is an Australian radio station in Queensland. Owned and operated as part of Southern Cross Austereo's Triple M network, it broadcasts a Mainstream Rock format to Gold Coast, Queensland. The radio station was originally 4GG on the AM band, and broadcasting commenced on 30 September 1965, with Frank Warrick reading the first words broadcast. The station moved to the FM band in 1989 as Triple G – later KROQ, then Gold FM. In November 2019 it was rebranded Triple M.

Programming
 5am-9am: Triple M Breakfast with Courto the mad dog
 9am-12pm: Courto the mad dogs morning show
 12pm-3pm: Arvo party with courto the mad dog
 3pm-4pm: The Mad dog courto show. 
 4pm-6pm: The Rush Hour with Courto the mad dog
 7pm-10pm: Triple M Nights with courto the mad dog

References

External links

Radio stations established in 1989
Radio stations on the Gold Coast, Queensland
Adult contemporary radio stations in Australia